Serghei Țvetcov (born 29 December 1988) is a Moldovan-born Romanian racing cyclist, who rides for the Denver Disruptors. He rode at the 2014 UCI Road World Championships, where he competed in both the road race and the individual time trial.

In the 2013 and 2014 seasons, he rode for the UCI Continental team . His best result in this time was third place in the 2014 USA Pro Cycling Challenge. Following this result, he signed for the UCI Professional Continental team  for the 2015 season.

In December 2022, Țvetcov was announced as part of the Denver Disruptors team for the inaugural season of the National Cycling League, in 2023.

Major results
Source: 

2007
 1st  Time trial, Moldovan National Road Championships
2008
 3rd Time trial, Moldovan National Road Championships
2009
 1st  Time trial, Moldovan National Road Championships
 4th Overall Tour of Romania
2010
 Moldovan National Road Championships
2nd Time trial
3rd Road race
2011
 10th Tobago Cycling Classic
2014
 1st Stage 3 (ITT) Tour of the Gila
 3rd Overall USA Pro Cycling Challenge
 3rd Overall Tour de Beauce
 6th Overall Tour of Alberta
 10th Overall Grand Prix Cycliste de Saguenay
2015
 Romanian National Road Championships
1st  Time trial
1st  Road race
 3rd Overall Sibiu Cycling Tour
1st  Romanian rider classification
 3rd Overall Tour of Szeklerland
1st Stage 3a (ITT)
2016
 Romanian National Road Championships
1st  Time trial
3rd Road race
 5th Overall Tour of Bihor
2017
 2nd Overall Colorado Classic
1st  Mountains classification
1st Stage 3 
 2nd Overall Tour of the Gila
 3rd Overall Tour of Utah
 5th Overall Cascade Cycling Classic
 7th Overall Tour of Taihu Lake
 10th Overall Grand Prix Cycliste de Saguenay
2018
 1st  Overall Tour de Korea
1st Stage 3
 1st  Overall Tour of Romania
1st Stage 2
 1st Chrono Kristin Armstrong
 2nd Overall Colorado Classic
 3rd Overall Tour de Beauce
1st  Points classification
1st Stage 3a (ITT)
 4th Overall Tour of the Gila
1st Stage 3 (ITT)
 4th Overall Tour of Taihu Lake
2019 
 1st  Time trial, Romanian National Road Championships
 1st Chrono Kristin Armstrong
 1st Stage 3 (ITT) Tour of the Gila
 4th Overall Tour of Romania
1st  Mountains classification
1st  Romanian rider classification
 5th Overall Tour de Beauce
1st Stage 3a (ITT)
 5th Overall Sibiu Cycling Tour
 9th Time trial, European Games
2020
 Romanian National Road Championships
1st  Time trial
2nd Road race
 2nd Overall Tour of Szeklerland
1st Stage 3a (ITT)
 5th Overall Tour of Romania
2021
 Romanian National Road Championships
1st  Time trial
1st  Road race
 2nd Overall Tour of Romania
2022
 3rd Road race, Romanian National Road Championships

Grand Tour general classification results timeline

References

External links

1988 births
Living people
Romanian male cyclists
Sportspeople from Chișinău
Cyclists at the 2016 Summer Olympics
Olympic cyclists of Romania
European Games competitors for Romania
Cyclists at the 2019 European Games